Vonones is a genus of armoured harvestmen in the family Cosmetidae. There are at least two described species in Vonones.

Species
These two species belong to the genus Vonones:
 Vonones ornatus (Say, 1821) i c g b
 Vonones sayi (Simon, 1879) i c g b
Data sources: i = ITIS, c = Catalogue of Life, g = GBIF, b = Bugguide.net

References

Further reading

 
 
 
 

Cosmetidae
Articles created by Qbugbot